Lanark was a county constituency of the House of Commons of the Parliament of the United Kingdom (Westminster) from 1918 to 1983. It elected one Member of Parliament (MP) by the first past the post voting system.

There was also an earlier Lanark Burghs constituency, from 1708 to 1832.

Boundaries

From 1918 the constituency consisted of "The Upper Ward County District, inclusive of all burghs situated therein, together with the part of the Middle Ward County District which is contained within the parishes of Avondale, East Kilbride, Glassford, and Stonehouse."

The Representation of the People Act 1948 provided that the constituency was to consist of "(i) The burghs of Biggar and Lanark; and (ii) the first, second and third districts and, so far as not included in the Hamilton constituency, the fourth and fifth districts."

Members of Parliament

Election results

Elections in the 1910s

Elections in the 1920s

Elections in the 1930s

Election in the 1940s

Elections in the 1950s

Elections in the 1960s

Elections in the 1970s

Notes and references 

Historic parliamentary constituencies in Scotland (Westminster)
Constituencies of the Parliament of the United Kingdom established in 1918
Constituencies of the Parliament of the United Kingdom disestablished in 1983
1918 establishments in Scotland
Politics of South Lanarkshire
Lanark